Anderen is a village in the Dutch province of Drenthe. It is a part of the municipality of Aa en Hunze, and lies about 8 km east of Assen.

The village was first mentioned in 1217 as Anderne. The etymology is unknown. Anderen is an esdorp without a church which developed in the Early Middle Ages on the Hondsrug.

Anderen was home to 121 people in 1840.

Transportation
There is no railway station here. The nearest station is Assen station. There are no bus services either, but bus services 10 and 28 stop 1 km south of Anderen on the road cbs.

For further information see Aa en Hunze#Transportation.

Gallery

References

Populated places in Drenthe
Aa en Hunze